Fourteen men's and seven women's rowing events took place at the 1995 Pan American Games in Mar del Plata, Argentina. The gold medals were won by rowers from the United States, Canada, Cuba and Argentina.The canoeing competitions at the 1995 Pan American Games took place in Mar Del Plata, Argentina.

Men's events

Women's events

Medal table

References

Events at the 1995 Pan American Games
Rowing at the Pan American Games
Rowing competitions in Argentina
1995 in rowing